Daryn Zhunussov (born August 31, 1991) is a Kazakhstani ice dancer. He competed with Canadian Cortney Mansour in the 2011–12 season and with Russian Ksenia Korobkova in 2013–14.

Programs

With Korobkova

With Mansour

Results

With Korobkova

With Mansour

References

External links 

 
 
 

1991 births
Kazakhstani male ice dancers
Living people
Sportspeople from Kokshetau
People from Kokshetau
People from Tinton Falls, New Jersey